Shannon Vreeland (born November 15, 1991) is an American former competition swimmer specializing in freestyle and Olympic gold medallist.  She was a member of the 2012 United States Olympic team, and won a gold medal in the 4×200-meter freestyle relay at the 2012 London Summer Olympics. Vreeland had won a total of nineteen medals in major international competitions, including thirteen gold medals, three silver, and three bronze, spanning the Olympics, World Championships, Pan Pacific Championships, and Summer Universiade. Vreeland retired after the 2016 Olympic Trials and began attending law school at Vanderbilt University in the fall of 2016.

Personal life 
Vreeland was born in St. Louis, Missouri to Connie and Daniel Vreeland, and has a twin sister, Michelle.  She grew up in Overland Park, Kansas, and attended Blue Valley West High School, graduating in 2010. Vreeland attended the University of Georgia, majoring in international affairs and economics, and graduated Omicron Delta Kappa and Phi Beta Kappa. In the fall of 2016, Vreeland began attending law school at Vanderbilt University, and graduated in May, 2019. After law school, she served as a legal clerk for the Eighth Circuit Court of Appeals for the Honorable Judge Duane Benton, and now works as an Environmental, Land Use, and Natural Resources associate at Alston & Bird LLP.

Swimming career

College Swimming 
Vreeland swam for coach Jack Bauerle's Georgia Bulldogs. She has been a member of three of the Bulldogs' NCAA national champion relay teams in the 4x200-yard relay event and one national champion relay team in the 4x100 freestyle relay, along with the NCAA team titles in 2013 and 2014. She earned NCAA All American honors 8 times throughout her college career.

2012 London Olympics 

At the 2012 United States Olympic Trials in Omaha, Nebraska, she placed fifth in the 200-meter freestyle event with a time of 1:57.90, thus qualifying as a member of the U.S. relay team in the 4×200-meter freestyle.  Vreeland also placed thirteenth overall in the 100-meter freestyle race with a time of 54.87 seconds.

At the 2012 Summer Olympics in London, she earned a spot on the finals lineup for the 4×200-meter freestyle relay after swimming the fastest split in the team in the morning prelims, 1:57.04. She earned a gold medal as a member of the winning U.S. relay team in the relay, together with Missy Franklin, Dana Vollmer and Allison Schmitt. She split 1:56.85 on the third leg of the relay. The first-place Americans set a new Olympic record for the event of 7:42.92.

2013 World Aquatics Championships 

Vreeland qualified to swim 5 events at the 2013 World Aquatics Championships in Barcelona, Spain: 100-meter freestyle, 200-meter freestyle, 4x100-meter freestyle relay, 4x200-meter freestyle relay, and 4x100-meter medley relay. In her individual events, Vreeland finished 7th in the 200-meter freestyle and 8th in the 100-meter freestyle. Vreeland won three gold medals in all three relays. In the 4x100-meter freestyle relay, Vreeland won gold alongside Missy Franklin, Natalie Coughlin, and Megan Romano. The relay team narrowly out touched Australia at 3:32.31, a new American record. This was the first time the U.S. women had won the 4x100-meter freestyle relay since 2003. Vreeland split a 1:56.97 on her leg in the 4x200-meter freestyle relay, in which the U.S. team of Vreeland, Franklin, Katie Ledecky, and Karlee Bispo touched first at 7:45.14, nearly two seconds ahead of second-place team Australia. Vreeland ended her meet by swimming the freestyle leg in the morning heats of the 4x100-meter medley relay. She received a gold medal when the finals lineup of Franklin, Jessica Hardy, Vollmer, and Romano won.

2014 Pan Pacific Championships 

Vreeland won a medal of each color at the 2014 Pan Pacific Championships in Gold Coast, Australia. She earned a bronze medal in the individual 200-meter freestyle with a 1:57.38, out-touching fourth-place finisher Melanie Schlanger by one-hundredth of a second. Alongside Simone Manuel, Missy Franklin, and Abbey Weitzeil, Vreeland earned a silver medal in the 4x100-meter freestyle relay. Additionally, Vreeland earned a gold medal leading off the 4x200-meter freestyle relay. With Franklin, Leah Smith, and Katie Ledecky, the relay team touched first at 7:46.40, a new championship record.

2016 Olympic Trials 
After battling an agonizing shoulder injury for several months, Vreeland swam her final races at the 2016 United States Olympic Trials, the U.S. qualifying meet for the Rio Olympics. She swam three events, the 100-, 200-, and 400-meter freestyle events. She qualified for the semifinals for both the 100- and 200-meter freestyles, but finished 13th in the 100-meter freestyle and 15th in the 200-meter freestyle. Since she didn't qualify for the Olympic team, Vreeland decided to retire and prepare for law school in the coming fall.

Personal best times

See also

 List of Olympic medalists in swimming (women)
 List of World Aquatics Championships medalists in swimming (women)
 List of University of Georgia people
 Georgia Bulldogs

References

External links
 
 
 
 
 
 
 Shannon Vreeland – University of Georgia athlete profile at GeorgiaDogs.com

1991 births
Living people
American female freestyle swimmers
Georgia Bulldogs women's swimmers
Medalists at the FINA World Swimming Championships (25 m)
Medalists at the 2012 Summer Olympics
Olympic gold medalists for the United States in swimming
Sportspeople from Overland Park, Kansas
Swimmers at the 2012 Summer Olympics
Twin sportspeople
American twins
World Aquatics Championships medalists in swimming
Universiade medalists in swimming
Universiade gold medalists for the United States
Universiade silver medalists for the United States
Universiade bronze medalists for the United States
Medalists at the 2015 Summer Universiade
Medalists at the 2011 Summer Universiade